CKVL-FM (FM 100,1 Radio LaSalle) is a community radio station located in Montreal, Quebec, Canada, broadcasting at 100.1 MHz. The station is owned and operated by La radio communautaire de Ville LaSalle, a non-profit organization.

The station primarily serves the Montreal borough of Lasalle, which is also the location of their studios and transmitter. Most of the station's programming is in French; however, the station is also authorized to use English.

The station is a member of the Association des radiodiffuseurs communautaires du Québec.

References

External links
 website
 CKVL-FM history - Canadian Communication Foundation
 REC Broadcast Query

Kvl
Kvl
Kvl
Radio stations established in 2008
2008 establishments in Quebec